MKO may refer to:

 ISO 639:mko or Mingang Doso, a language of Nigeria
  Mojahedin-e-Khalq Organization, Iran
 Mauna Kea Observatories, Hawaii
 Münchener Kammerorchester, Munich chamber orchestra
 IATA code for Davis Field airport, Muskogee, Oklahoma
 Mary-Kate Olsen, American designer and businessperson 
 Markona railway station, Odisha, India
 MKO Abiola (1937–1998), Nigerian businessperson
 Mechanical Keep Out, the clearance required around a PCBA to avoid mechanical fitment issues